Jumping the Tracks is a 1991 album by the Belgian punk band The Scabs. The album was one of the two albums released at the peak of the band's popularity, following Royalty in Exile.

Track list 
 Keep on Driving – 3'38
 Robbin' The Liquor Store – 5'46
 Don't You Know – 3'22
 Tell Me About It – 4'14
 Demons – 3'39
 Nothing on My Radio – 4'50
 Hello Lonesome – 3'26
 Read the Magazine – 2'53
 Hard to Forget – 2'53
 You Got My Name, You Got My Number – 3'22
 So – 4'07
 Tracy – 4'15

References

1991 albums